Piereis is a former municipality in the Kavala regional unit, East Macedonia and Thrace, Greece. Since the 2011 local government reform it is part of the municipality Pangaio, of which it is a municipal unit. The municipal unit has an area of 143.402 km2. Population 4,011 (2011). The seat of the municipality was in Moustheni.

References

Populated places in Kavala (regional unit)

bg:Пиерес
el:Δήμος Πιερέων